Stavros Lambrinidis (born 6 February 1962) is a Greek lawyer and politician who has served as the Ambassador of the European Union to the United States since March 2019. He previously served as the European Union Special Representative for Human Rights from 2012 to 2019 and Minister for Foreign Affairs from June 2011 to November 2011.

Early life
Lambrinidis was born in Athens on 6 February 1962. After graduating from the Athens College high school, Lambrinidis was admitted to the University of Chicago in 1980 and transferred to Amherst College in 1981, where he received his B.A. degree in economics and political science with the distinctions of magna cum laude, Phi Beta Kappa and a scholarship for the rest of his studies. He completed his education in 1988 with a J.D. degree from Yale Law School.

At Yale University Lambrinidis worked as a teaching assistant in the School of Organization and Management, as well as managing editor of The Yale Journal of International Law.

Early career 

Lambrinidis trained in International Trade, Transactions and Arbitration, as a colleague of Lloyd Cutler (founder of Wilmer, Cutler & Pickering in Washington, D.C. and law advisor of the White House during Jimmy Carter's and Bill Clinton's Presidencies). He also served as president of the Committee for Human Rights in the Bar Association of Washington, D.C.

Lambrinidis's career in Greece started in 1994 as a special advisor to former Prime Minister of Greece and President of the Socialist International George A. Papandreou, and continued as the chief-of-staff of the Minister of Foreign Affairs during Theodoros Pangalos's post in the ministry in 1996. Between 1996 and 1999, he was secretary general of the Greek foreign affairs ministry responsible for diaspora Greeks. He subsequently became an Ambassador at Large of the Hellenic Republic and, in 2000, the director general of the International Olympic Truce Center (International Olympic Committee organization).

During this period, Lambrinidis was a visiting lecturer at the International Olympic Academy in Athens, as well as a lecturer in the Diplomatic and Police Academies of Greece. He was also a guest speaker at the World Economic Forum in Davos, Switzerland in the years 2003 and 2004.

European Parliament 
Lambrinidis started his career in the European Parliament on 20 July 2004, as a Member of the European Parliament for the Greek Social Democratic Party PA.SO.K. A few months later, he was elected as the vice president of the Party of European Socialists and in April 2005, as head of the parliamentary delegation of Panhellenic Socialist Movement (PA.SO.K.) to the European Parliament.

During this term, Lambrinidis served as a vice president of the Parliament's Committee on Civil Liberties, Justice and Home Affairs (LIBE), as a Member of the Delegation of Relations with the United States, as well as a Substitute-Member of the Delegation of Relations with Iran and the Committee of the Constitutional Affairs.

In July 2009, Lambrinidis was elected as a Vice President of the European Parliament, while in November 2010, he was a speaker of the European Data Protection and Privacy Conference.

In 2012 as a popular politician, with extensive experience in the diplomatic field, international trade, foreign relations and a political instinct, Lambrinidis was considered the leading candidate for the position of United Nations Under Secretary General for Public Information before the assumption of his European Union duties.

Minister for Foreign Affairs 

Following a cabinet reshuffle that took place on 17 June 2011 in Athens, Greece, Prime Minister George A. Papandreou announced Lambrinidis as the new Minister for Foreign Affairs of Greece.

A month after assuming his new post, Lambrinidis signed a Cultural Memorandum of Understanding with the U.S. Secretary of State, Hillary Clinton, on import restrictions for archaeological finds in order to combat the illegal trade of Greek antiquities that have frequently turned up in foreign museums.

As Foreign Affairs Minister of the Hellenic Republic, Lambrinidis visited numerous European countries, to explain the effectiveness of the reforms taking place in Greece and the investment opportunities in the country. During his public engagements, he also made a number of proposals about the establishment of new international instruments to tackle economic inequalities, and to generate funds for economic development projects such as the financial transactions tax, and new political and economic governance instruments that would make the European Union more united, in order to be able to prevent and tackle more effectively future financial crises.

In September 2011, Lambrinidis represented Greece at the 66th General Assembly of the United Nations, while a few days later he was the keynote speaker in the World Leadership Forum, which is annually organized by the Foreign Policy Association.

E.U.S.R. Lambrinidis was succeeded by M.P. Stavros Dimas in November 2011, after an agreement between the parties that participated in the Coalition Government.

Special representative 

A long-standing request for a representative that would be in charge of enhancing the effectiveness and visibility of the E.U.'s Human Rights policy, based on the Strategic Framework and Action Plan on Human Rights and Democracy (officially adopted on 25 June 2012), led to the creation of the post of the Special Representative of the European Union for Human Rights. The post which is providing a strong, independent, flexible, and sufficiently broad mandate is aimed at increasing the European Union's effectiveness, coherence, and visibility in protecting and promoting human rights in the EU's foreign policy. It covers fields such as the strengthening of all Human rights, Democracy, International Justice, Humanitarian Law, anti-discrimination, and the abolition of the death penalty.

On 25 July 2012, the High Representative of the Union for Foreign Affairs and Security Policy, Baroness Ashton of Upholland, appointed Lambrinidis as the first  European Union's Special Representative for Human Rights, with a renewable two years mandate.

During his mandate, Lambrinidis has paid official visits for meetings with governments and civil society in numerous countries around the world, including China, Cuba, Myanmar, Bahrain, Pakistan,  Indonesia, Brazil, Mexico Morocco, South Africa, Azerbaijan, Russia, Norway, Belarus, the United States, and the United Nations in Geneva and New York. His work has been praised by European Union Foreign Affairs Ministers and the High Representative of the Union for Foreign Affairs and Security Policy Federica Mogherini.

Ambassadorship to the United States 

On 4 March 2019, Lambrinidis assumed the post of EU Ambassador to the United States. On the day of his ascension, the EU Delegation to the United States was raised in the U.S. Diplomatic Corps' Order of Precedence. The Trump Administration had previously lowered the delegation's protocol status to that of international organisations, a tier below the highest level - usually reserved for countries. As a result, Lambrinidis per protocol holds the rank equivalent of Ambassador Extraordinary and Plenipotentiary to the United States of America.

Awards and distinctions 
 Emeritus Professor at the Mariupol Institute of Humanities of the Donetsk National University in Donetsk Oblast, Ukraine
 Hellenic Leadership Conference, for his work in the promotion of Hellenic perspectives abroad
 M.E.P. Candidate of the Year 2006
 Former President of the District of Columbia Bar Association's Human Rights Committee
 Board Member of the American Bar Association's Trade Committee
 Editor of the A.B.A. International Trade Newsletter
 Champion of Freedom Award 2020, Electronic Privacy Information Center (EPIC)

Publications
 "Integration of Immigrants into the E.U." - European Parliament's Reports
 "Promoting Security and Fundamental Rights in the Electronic Age" - European Parliament's Reports
 “The Positive Narrative on Human Rights” - The European Union’s New Foreign Policy, ed. Martin Westlake, Palgrave Macmillan Press 2020

See also
 Cabinet of Greece
 European External Action Service
 List of Phi Beta Kappa Members
 List of Yale Law School Alumni

References

External links
 Foreign Minister Stavros Lambrinidis on B.B.C. Hardtalk
 Foreign Minister Stavros Lambrinidis on Charlie Rose
 Interview with E.U.S.R. Stavros Lambrinidis Radio France Internationale
 Stavros Lambrinidis in the World Leadership Forum 2011
 E.U.S.R. Stavros Lambrinidis live at Italy's "Otto e Mezzo" with Lilly Gruber 
 E.U.S.R. Stavros Lambrinidis in the Official Website of the Party of European Socialists
 
 

|-

1962 births
Amherst College alumni
Ambassadors of Greece
Ambassadors of the European Union to the United States
Foreign ministers of Greece
Living people
MEPs for Greece 2004–2009
MEPs for Greece 2009–2014
PASOK MEPs
PASOK politicians
Politicians from Athens
Yale Law School alumni